Rowa Wildlife Sanctuary is a Wildlife Sanctuary in Tripura, India. It covers an area of only .

This national park will bring you closer to several species of birds, mammals, reptiles, etc. It is open for tourists throughout the year.This wildlife Sanctuary is in Dharmanagar forest Sub Division.

Notes

External links
Tripura

Wildlife sanctuaries in Tripura
Protected areas with year of establishment missing